Athanasios "Sakis" Karidas (alternate spelling: Karydas) (Greek: Αθανάσιος "Σάκης" Καρύδας; born November 4, 1979) is a Greek former professional basketball player. At a height of 6 ft 1 in (1.85 m) tall, he ;played at the point guard position.

Professional career
Karidas began his pro career in 2003 with Xanthi. He then moved to ICBS in 2005. He next played with MENT, whom he joined in 2007. He then moved to Ilysiakos in 2008. In 2011, he signed with KAOD. In 2012, he moved to Koroivos.

In August 2014, he joined SEFA Arkadikos, after being selected as the Greek 2nd Division's MVP. He was a key player in helping SEFA Arkadikos earn promotion to the Greek 1st Division for the 2015–16 season.

References

External links
Eurobasket.com Profile
Draftexpress.com Profile
Greek Basket League Profile 

1979 births
Living people
Arkadikos B.C. players
Doxa Lefkadas B.C. players
Greek men's basketball players
Greek Basket League players
ICBS B.C. players
K.A.O.D. B.C. players
Koroivos B.C. players
Ilysiakos B.C. players
MENT B.C. players
Panionios B.C. players
Point guards
Xanthi B.C. players
Basketball players from Serres